PEP may refer to:

Computing
Packetized Ensemble Protocol, used by Telebit modems
pretty Easy privacy (pEp), encryption project
Python Enhancement Proposal, for the Python programming language
Packet Exchange Protocol in Xerox Network Systems
Performance-enhancing proxy, mechanisms to improve end-to-end TCP performance
Policy Enforcement Point in XACML

Organizations
 Political and Economic Planning, a British think tank formed in 1931
 Politically exposed person, a financial classification
 Priority Enforcement Program, in US immigration enforcement
 Promoting Enduring Peace, a UN organization
 Propellants, Explosives, Pyrotechnics, a journal
 Provincial Emergency Program (British Columbia)

Biology and medicine
Polyestradiol phosphate, an estrogen used to treat prostate cancer
Polymorphic eruption of pregnancy or pruritic urticarial papules and plaques of pregnancy
Post-exposure prophylaxis, preventive medical treatment
post-ERCP pancreatitis, a complication after endoscopic retrograde cholangiopancreatography
Phosphoenolpyruvic acid, a biochemical compound

Physics
 Pep reaction, proton–electron–proton reaction
 Peak envelope power of a transmitter

People
Pep Guardiola, Spanish football manager and former player

Other uses
 Pairwise error probability in digital communications
 Passaporte Electrónico Português, Portuguese electronic passport
 PEP, a studio album by musician Lights
 New York Stock Exchange symbol for PepsiCo
 Personal equity plan, a former UK account type
 Positron-Electron Projects at Stanford Linear Accelerator Center
 Post – eCommerce – Parcel, Divisions of Deutsche Post
 Primary Entry Point, a station of the US Emergency Alert System
 Primate Equilibrium Platform, used in animal experimentation
 Progressive except Palestine, a pro-Palestinian political phrase
 Prototype Electro-Pneumatic family of trains, British Rail Classes 445 and 446
 Pulsed energy projectile, a  non-lethal weapon

See also
 Pep (disambiguation)